Gwent Wildlife Trust (GWT) is a wildlife trust covering the area between the lower Wye and Rhymney rivers which forms the vice county of Monmouthshire in south-east Wales. It is a registered charity and a member of the Wildlife Trusts Partnership.

History
Its origins lie in the Monmouthshire Naturalists Trust, formed in 1963.  In the 1980s the Trust was renamed the Gwent Trust for Nature Conservation, and then Gwent Wildlife Trust.  Gwent was an administrative county between 1974 and 1996, covering a similar but not identical area to the historic county of Monmouthshire.

The Trust's first objective, under the then presidency of FitzRoy Somerset, 4th Baron Raglan, was the conservation of Magor Marsh, the last remaining area of fenland on the Caldicot Level. It was particularly responsible for survey work, training programmes, and increasingly in educational projects and in campaigns against inappropriate development proposals, particularly those affecting the Severn estuary. In 1991 it purchased Pentwyn Farm at Penallt, a unique smallholding, including ancient meadows and a collapsing medieval barn, having raised the purchase price of £150,000 within six weeks through a public appeal.  In 2001 it bought Springdale Farm near Usk, containing  of species-rich unimproved grassland,  of other grassland, and an ancient wood. It now manages 32 reserves, and has a membership of some 7,500.

Current activities and responsibilities

Projects such as wild flower meadow restoration take place on the reserves. Its projects also involve reviving traditional countryside skills such as charcoal production and dry stone walling.

The Trust currently designates four "Premier Reserves":
 Magor Marsh.  This is a  wetland reserve with a rich variety of habitats, including damp hay meadows, sedge fen, reedbed, scrub, wet woodland, a large pond and numerous reens. It includes breeding grounds for common snipe, common redshank, reed warbler, grasshopper warbler and Cetti's warbler.  It is the richest site in Wales for wetland beetles and soldier-flies. It is the last remnant of fenland on the Caldicot and Wentloog Levels, and its pattern of drainage ditches and other features has remained unchanged since the 14th century.
Pentwyn Farm. It contains one of the largest areas of unimproved grassland in the area, and provides a habitat for dormice, adders-tongue fern, and many other species.
Silent Valley Nature Reserve. The reserve is managed in partnership with Blaenau Gwent County Borough Council.
Springdale Farm.

Objectives
The Trust's objectives can be summarised as:
Vision: "Our vision is for people close to nature, in a landscape rich in wildlife."
Mission: "Our mission is to champion nature conversation and inspire people about wildlife in Gwent."

Full list of reserves

 Allt-yr-yn, Newport
 Branches Fork Meadow, Pontypool
 Brockwells Meadow, Caerwent
 Caldicot Pill, Caldicot
 Coed Meyric Moel, Cwmbran  
 Croes Robert Wood SSSI, Trellech
 Dan Y Graig, Risca
 Dixton Embankment, Monmouth
 Drybridge Community Nature Park, Monmouth
 Graig Wood, Trellech
 Henllys Bog, Cwmbran
 Kitty's Orchard, Usk
 Margarets Wood, Whitebrook
 Lower Minnetts Field, Rogiet
 Magor Marsh SSSI, Magor 
 Margaret's Wood, Whitebrook
 New Grove Meadows, Trellech
 Pentwyn Farm SSSI, Penallt 
 Peterstone Wentlooge Marshes SSSI, Peterstone
 Priory Wood SSSI, Bettws Newydd  
 Prisk Wood SSSI, Penallt
 Rogiet Poorland, Rogiet
 Silent Valley SSSI, Cwm
 Solutia Reserve at Great Traston Meadows, Nash
 Springdale Farm, Llangwm
 Strawberry Cottage Wood, Llanvihangel Crucorney
 The Wern, Monmouth
 Wyeswood Common, Trellech

References

External links
 Gwent Wildlife Trust

Wildlife Trusts of Wales
Environment of Gwent
1963 establishments in Wales
Nature reserves in Monmouthshire
Organisations based in Monmouthshire